Magdalena Ventura with Her Husband and Son or The Bearded Lady is a 1631 oil on canvas painting by the Spanish artist Jusepe de Ribera. It is now part of the Fundación Casa Ducal de Medinaceli collection and displayed at the 
Museo Nacional del Prado in Madrid.

Description
The painting displays Magdalena Ventura standing while nursing her baby, with her husband standing behind her in the shadows. To the right are two steles, the top one listing the details of their family story in Latin, proclaiming it as A Wonder of Nature. The second stele extolls her unusual nature while still have a child and husband, as well as the work of the painter and the proud owner who commissioned it.

The painting was mentioned in various period diaries. All of the information known about Magdalena Ventura is derived from quotes and documents referring to the painting. Supposedly, Duke of Alcalá was moved to commission the painting based on rumors he heard about her. The stele claims that at the time of painting, she was 52, and began to show facial hair growth at 37. She had at least two other children, and was an Italian from the nearby region of Abruzzi. Magdalena likely helped or was the primary source of income through her facial hair, as the painting shows her with a long, untrimmed beard. This is stark contrast with her husband's more fashionably trimmed beard. The simple act of standing while nursing is also an unusual pose for 17th-century women, and was associated with accounts of strong African women nursing in unusual ways. Painting Magdalena Ventura in such a manner would have served to emphasize her "manliness" and strength.

The painting was a part of a gallery of portraits of people deemed "unusual," particularly of people with characteristics popular among travelling acts of the period, like dwarfism. Ribera was later commissioned to make another portrait, this time of a club-footed boy, The Clubfoot, in 1642.

See also
 Bearded lady

References

Sources

 The Duke of Alcalá: His Collection and Its Evolution, by Jonathan Brown and Richard L. Kagan, The Art Bulletin, vol. 69, no. 2, 1987, pp. 231–255, on JSTOR

External links
Painting record on artble
Painting record on Medinaceli Foundation website

1631 paintings
Paintings by Jusepe de Ribera
17th-century portraits
Bearded women
Paintings in Toledo, Spain